The Pioneer Football League (PFL) is a collegiate athletic conference which operates in the United States. The conference participates in the NCAA's Division I Football Championship Subdivision (FCS) as a football-only conference. It has member schools that range from New York, North Carolina, and Florida in the east to California in the west. It is headquartered in St. Louis, in the same complex that also contains the offices of the Missouri Valley Conference and Missouri Valley Football Conference. Unlike most other Division I FCS conferences, the Pioneer League consists of institutions that choose not to award athletic scholarships ("grants-in-aid") to football players.

Most of the PFL's members are private schools. Morehead State University is currently the only public school in the conference.

History

Foundation 
Following an NCAA rule change passed in January 1991, which required Division I schools to conduct all sports at the Division I level by 1993, the conference was formed by charter members Butler University, the University of Dayton, Drake University, the University of Evansville, and Valparaiso University. The University of San Diego joined in 1992, and the league played its first season in 1993. The six original schools which played in the 1993 season had previously sponsored football at the Division I, Division II and Division III levels.

Membership changes
Original contraction

In 1997, the league reduced to five members when the University of Evansville downgraded football from Division I to club status; Evansville explored upgrading football back to Division I in 2007, but decided against it.

2001 expansion

In 2001, the conference nearly doubled in size and was reorganized with the five pre-2001 members forming the North Division, and newcomers Austin Peay State University, Davidson College, Jacksonville University and Morehead State University forming the South Division.  The reorganization spawned a new championship system in which the best record holders from each division would play in a title game for the conference championship.

2005–2008 membership changes

On April 8, 2005, Austin Peay announced its departure from the league effective after the 2005 season; Austin Peay returned to scholarship-granting competition in 2007 as a member of the Ohio Valley Conference in which it competes in other sports.  As a result, the conference reverted to round-robin play; the divisions and championship game were abolished.  On April 7, 2006, Campbell University announced the reinstatement of football effective in 2008, and on December 5, 2007, accepted an invitation to the PFL.  In February 2008, Marist College announced that it would join the PFL for the 2009 season, after the MAAC stopped sponsoring football. Although Campbell moved in 2011 from the Atlantic Sun Conference to the Big South Conference, which sponsors football, it did not join the Big South in football and remained in the PFL through the 2017 season.

2013 membership changes & automatic playoff berth

On June 13, 2011, Mercer University and Stetson University were announced as league members (effective 2013) bringing membership to 12 schools.  In addition, as of 2013, the league has an automatic bid into the FCS division I playoffs.  Soon after its PFL membership was announced, Mercer accepted an invitation to join the Southern Conference (scholarship-granting) effective July 1, 2014.  During its one season in the league, Mercer set a Division I win–loss record for start-up programs; Mercer finished the 2013 season with an overall record of 10–2 including an undefeated 8–0 record at home, also a Division I record held jointly with Auburn University, which likewise went undefeated at home in 2013.

On July 1, 2014, Mercer University joined the Southern Conference for all sports, including football.

The next change in conference membership was announced on November 14, 2016, when Campbell announced it would transition to scholarship football and add that sport to its existing Big South membership effective with the 2018 season, temporarily reducing the PFL membership to 10. Barring any further changes to conference membership, the PFL would have returned to 11 members in 2021, following the November 20, 2017 announcement of Presbyterian College that it would join the conference starting with the 2021 season. Presbyterian remains in the Big South Conference for all other sports. While Presbyterian did not become a full conference member until July 2021, it began PFL play in the spring 2021 season, rescheduled from fall 2020 due to COVID-19. After two PFL members chose not to play in the 2020–21 school year, the conference entered into a scheduling agreement with Presbyterian that included it in the spring 2021 schedule. While PC was not eligible for the PFL title in that season, it was eligible for the league's individual awards and honors.

2019: Jacksonville drops football

On December 3, 2019 Jacksonville University announced that it discontinued its football program immediately.

2021: Further expansion

Presbyterian was joined as a new PFL member in 2021 by the University of St. Thomas, a Twin Cities school that had been expelled from its longtime Division III home of the Minnesota Intercollegiate Athletic Conference (MIAC) effective in 2021–22. Shortly after the MIAC announced St. Thomas' expulsion, the Summit League, a non-football Division I conference, offered the Tommies membership. The NCAA announced on July 15, 2020 that it had granted a waiver to allow St. Thomas to make the jump to D-I on a five-year schedule, instead of the four years used for moves from Division II. The Tommies will not be eligible for the FCS playoffs until the transition is completed in 2026.

Member schools

Current members

Notes

Former members

Notes

Membership timeline

Rivalries
One in-state rivalry currently exists in the PFL. A second had existed before Jacksonville discontinued its football program.

Butler and Valparaiso first played in 1927, and had nine meetings prior to 1951. That year, the two teams began playing every year, and in 2006 began playing for the Hoosier Helmet Trophy. Butler currently leads 47–24. The two schools had an all-sports rivalry as well when both were in the Horizon League together from 2007 to 2012.

Jacksonville and Stetson had a football rivalry that ran from 2013, when Stetson began PFL play, to 2019, after which Jacksonville dropped football. The schools have been conference rivals in other sports since 1998, when Jacksonville joined the ASUN Conference, home to Stetson since 1985.

Butler and Dayton also have a rivalry based on proximity to each other. The teams have met every year since 1977 with the exception of 1991 and 1992. Dayton leads 26–11–1.

Conference championships

PFL champions

(*) Due to COVID-19, the Pioneer Football League suspended the fall 2020 football season. Dayton and Marist opted out of the spring season. Presbyterian played a full PFL schedule, but was ineligible for the conference title, and its games were not counted in PFL standings.

League titles by school

* – Won in PFL Championship Game
× – played in spring 2021
Italics – Co-champions

PFL Championship Game

Postseason games
The Pioneer Football League has had alliances with the Gridiron Classic and the Sports Network Cup. In addition, league members are allowed to accept at-large invitations to other college bowl games and teams are eligible to compete in the FCS playoffs.

Through the 2012 season, the NCAA did not offer the league an automatic invite to the FCS playoffs and never offered an at-large bid to any of its teams, effectively barring the league from the tournament. Starting in 2013, the Pioneer League received an automatic bid to compete in the Division I Football Championship as the playoffs expanded from 20 teams to 24. The PFL won its first playoff game in 2016, as San Diego advanced past the first round of the playoffs.

The PFL was a participant in the NCAA Division I FCS Consensus Mid-Major Football National Championship, along with the Northeast Conference and Metro Atlantic Athletic Conference, two other conferences without automatic playoff bids. The Consensus championship has since been discontinued; the NEC first earned an automatic postseason bid in 2010, while the MAAC no longer sponsors football.

Members pre-PFL postseason results
Below are postseason accomplishments by past and current members prior to the formation of the Pioneer Football League.

PFL Sports Network Cup results 
See Sports Network Cup

PFL Gridiron Classic results
From 2006 through 2009, the PFL and Northeast Conference (NEC) staged the Gridiron Classic, an exempted postseason football game that matched the champions of the two conferences which were technically members of Division I FCS, but which were not the recipients of automatic invitations to the football championship playoff at the time.

NCAA Division I Football Championship results
Since 2013, the PFL champion has received an invite to the FCS playoffs; previously, PFL teams had to receive an at-large bid, which no team ever received.

(*) - St. Thomas was the PFL champion in 2022; however, they were ineligible for postseason play due to still being in transition from Division III. Davidson, the runner-up, was awarded the auto-bid in their place.

Historical standings

Conference facilities

See also 
List of American collegiate athletic stadiums and arenas

References

External links 

 

 
Sports organizations established in 1991
Articles which contain graphical timelines
1991 establishments in the United States